The Ministry of Economy was a government department responsible for the economic affairs of the Republic of Turkey. It was established following the 2011 general election with Justice and Development Party (AKP) Member of Parliament Zafer Çağlayan being appointed as the first Minister of the Economy.

In 2018, this ministry was merged with the Ministry of Customs and Trade forming the new Ministry of Trade.

References

Economy
Turkey
Turkey, Economy
2011 establishments in Turkey